Palermo (locally also  or ) is a city in southern Italy, the capital of both the autonomous region of Sicily and the Metropolitan City of Palermo, the city's surrounding metropolitan province. The city is noted for its history, culture, architecture and gastronomy, playing an important role throughout much of its existence; it is over 2,700 years old. Palermo is in the northwest of the island of Sicily, by the Gulf of Palermo in the Tyrrhenian Sea.

Palermo then became a possession of Carthage. As , the town became part of the Roman Republic and Empire for over a thousand years. From 831 to 1072 the city was under Arab rule in the Emirate of Sicily when the city became the capital of Sicily for the first time.
Following the Norman conquest, Palermo became the capital of a new kingdom, the Kingdom of Sicily, that lasted from 1130 to 1816.

The population of Palermo urban area is estimated by Eurostat to be 855,285, while its metropolitan area is the fifth most populated in Italy with around 1.2 million people. In the central area, the city has a population of around 676,000 people. The inhabitants are known as Palermitani or, poetically, panormiti. The languages spoken by its inhabitants are the Italian language and the Palermitano dialect of the Sicilian language.

Palermo is Sicily's cultural, economic and tourism capital. It is a city rich in history, culture, art, music and food. Numerous tourists are attracted to the city for its appealing Mediterranean climate, its renowned gastronomy and restaurants, its Romanesque, Gothic, Baroque and Art Nouveau churches, palaces and buildings, and its nightlife and music. Palermo is the main Sicilian industrial and commercial center: the main industrial sectors include tourism, services, commerce and agriculture. Palermo has an international airport and a significant underground economy.
For cultural, artistic and economic reasons, Palermo is one of the largest cities in the Mediterranean and is now among the top tourist destinations in both Italy and Europe. It is the main seat of the UNESCO World Heritage Site Arab-Norman Palermo and the Cathedral Churches of Cefalù and Monreale. The city is also going through careful redevelopment, preparing to become one of the major cities of the Euro-Mediterranean area.

Roman Catholicism is highly important in Palermitan culture. The Patron Saint of Palermo is Santa Rosalia whose Feast Day is celebrated on 15 July. The area attracts significant numbers of tourists each year and is widely known for its colourful fruit, vegetable and fish markets at the heart of Palermo, known as Vucciria, Ballarò and Capo.

Geography 

Palermo lies in a basin, formed by the Papireto, Kemonia and Oreto rivers. The basin was named the Conca d'Oro (the Golden Basin) by the Arabs in the 9th century. The city is surrounded by a mountain range which is named after the city itself. These mountains face the Tyrrhenian Sea. Palermo is home to a natural port and offers excellent views to the sea, especially from Monte Pellegrino.

Climate 

Palermo experiences a hot-summer subtropical Mediterranean climate (Köppen climate classification: Csa) with moderate seasonality. Summers are very long, hot and dry due to the domination of subtropical high pressure system, while winters are mild and changeable, with rainy weather due to the polar front. Temperatures in autumn and spring are typically warm. It receives approximately 2,530 hours of sunshine per year. Snow is a rare occurrence having snowed about a dozen times since 1945. Since the 1940s to nowadays there have been at least five times when considerable snowfall has occurred. Snowfalls also occurred in 1981, 1986, 1999 and 2014. In the period from November to May, the average sea temperature exceeds  and in the period from June to October, the average sea temperature exceeds .

Topography 

Palermo is surrounded by mountains, which form a cirque around the city. Some districts of the city are divided by the mountains themselves. Historically, it was relatively difficult to reach the inner part of Sicily from the city because of the mounts. However, historically, the most important mount is Monte Pellegrino, which is geographically separated from the rest of the range by a plain. The mount lies right in front of the Tyrrhenian Sea. Monte Pellegrino's cliff was described in the 19th century by Johann Wolfgang von Goethe, as "the most beautiful promontory in the world", in his essay "Italian Journey".

Rivers 

Today both the Papireto river and the Kemonia are covered up by buildings. However, the shape of the former watercourses can still be recognised today, because the streets that were built on them follow their shapes. Today the only waterway not drained yet is the Oreto river that divides the downtown of the city from the western uptown and the industrial districts. In the basins there were, though, many seasonal torrents that helped formed swampy plains, reclaimed during history; a good example of which can be found in the borough of Mondello.

Districts 

Shown above are the thirty five quarters of Palermo: these thirty five neighbourhoods or "quartiere" as they are known, are further divided into eight governmental community boards.

Landmarks 

Palermo has a large architectural heritage and is notable for its many Norman buildings.

Palaces and museums 

 Palazzo dei Normanni (the Norman Palace), a notable example of Norman architecture, this palace houses the Cappella Palatina.
 Zisa (1160) and Cuba, magnificent castles/houses historically used by the kings of Palermo for hunting. The Zisa today houses the Islamic museum. The Cuba was once encircled by water.
 Palazzo Natoli
 Palazzo Chiaramonte
 Palazzo Abatellis: Built at the end of the 15th century for the prefect of the city, Francesco Abatellis. It is a massive though elegant construction, in typical Catalan Gothic style, with Renaissance influences. The Gallery houses an Eleonora of Aragon bust by Francesco Laurana (1471) and the Malvagna Triptych ( 1510), by Jan Gossaert and an Annunziata by Antonello da Messina.
 Antonino Salinas Regional Archeological Museum: museum includes numerous remains from Etruscan, Carthaginian, Roman and Hellenistic civilisations. It houses all the decorative remains from the Sicilian temples of Segesta and Selinunte.
 Palazzina Cinese royal residence of the House of Bourbon-Two Sicilies and location of the Ethnographic Museum of Sicily.

Churches 

 Palermo Cathedral: the long history of the cathedral led to an accumulation of different architectural styles, the latest being the 18th century.
 Cappella Palatina, 12th century chapel of the Palazzo dei Normanni, has outstanding mosaics in both Western and the Eastern traditions and a roof by Saracen craftsmen.
 San Giovanni dei Lebbrosi
 San Giovanni degli Eremiti: 12th-century church, near Palazzo dei Normanni, notable for bright red domes, a remnant of Arab influence in Sicily. In his Diary of an Idle Woman in Sicily, F. Elliot described it as "... totally oriental... it would fit well in Baghdad or Damascus". The bell tower is an example of Norman architecture.
 Chiesa della Martorana: Also known as Santa Maria dell'Ammiraglio (St Mary of the Admiral), church annexed to the next-door church of San Cataldo and overlooks Piazza Bellini in central Palermo. Original layout was a compact cross-in-square ("Greek cross plan"), a common south Italian and Sicilian variant of the middle Byzantine period church style. Three eastern apses adjoin directly to the naos, instead of being separated by an additional bay, as was usual in eastern Byzantine architecture. The bell tower, lavishly decorated, still serves as the main entrance to the church. The interior decoration is elaborate, and includes Byzantine mosaics.
 San Cataldo: Church on central Piazza Bellini, another example of Norman architecture.
 Santa Maria della Gancia
 Santa Caterina: Church located on Piazza Bellini, behind Piazza Pretoria, built between 1566–1596.
 Santa Maria della Catena: Built between 1490 and 1520. Designed by Matteo Carnilivari: The name derives from chains that were once attached to one of the walls.
 San Domenico: Located near Via Roma, now “Pantheon of illustrious Sicilians”.
 San Giuseppe dei Teatini: Located near the Quattro Canti, it is an example of Sicilian Baroque.
 Oratorio di San Lorenzo Working in stucco, Rococo sculptor Giacomo Serpotta and his family decorated the church (1690/98–1706) with such a profusion of statuary, and an abundance of putti, the walls appear alive. In October 1969, two thieves removed Caravaggio's Nativity with St. Francis and St. Lawrence from its frame. It has never been recovered.
 Oratorio del Rosario: Completed by Giacomo Serpotta in (1710–17)
 Santa Teresa alla Kalsa, derives its name from Al-Khalisa, an Arabic term meaning elected, was constructed between 1686 and 1706 over the former Emir's residence, is one of the best examples of Sicilian Baroque. It has a single, airy nave, with stucco decorations from the early 18th century.
 Santa Maria dello Spasimo was built in 1506 and later turned into a hospital. This church inspired Raphael to paint his famous Sicilia's Spasimo, now in the Museo del Prado. The church today is a fascinating open-air auditorium, which occasionally houses exhibitions and musical shows.
 Church of the Gesù (Church of Jesus): Located in the city centre, the church was built in 1564 in the late-Renaissance style by the Jesuits. It was built over a pre-existing convent of Basilian monks. Alterations in 1591 were completed in a Sicilian Baroque. The church was heavily damaged after the 1943 bombings, which destroyed most of the frescos. The interior has a Latin cross plan with a nave and two aisles, and has a particularly rich decoration of marbles, intarsia and stuccoes, especially in St Anne's Chapel. At the right is the Casa Professa, with a 1685 portal and a precious 18th century cloister. The building has been home to the Municipal Library since 1775.
 San Francesco di Assisi: church built between 1255 and 1277 in what was once the market district of the city, at the site of two pre-existing churches and was largely renovated in the 15th, 16th, 18th and 19th centuries, the last after an earthquake. After the 1943 bombings, the church was restored to its Medieval appearance, which now includes part of the original building such as part of the right side, the apses and the Gothic portal in the façade. The interior has a typical Gothic flavour, with a nave and two aisles separated by two rows of cylindrical pilasters. Some of the chapels are in Renaissance style, as well as the late 16th century side portals. The church includes precious sculptures by Antonio, Giacomo Gagini and Francesco Laurana. Of note are also statues built by Giacomo Serpotta in 1723.
 Church of the Magione: Officially known as the church of the Holy Trinity. This church was built in the Norman style in 1191 by Matteo d'Ajello, who donated it to the Cistercian monks.

Squares and public monuments 

 Quattro Canti is a small square at the crossing of the ancient main roads (now: Corso Vittorio Emanuele and Via Maqueda) dividing the town into its quarters (mandamenti). The buildings at the corner have diagonal baroque façades so the square has an almost octagonal form.
 Piazza Pretoria was planned in the 16th century near the Quattro Canti as the site of a fountain by Francesco Camilliani, the Fontana Pretoria.
 The monument to Charles V on Piazza Bologni, erected in 1631.

City walls 

Palermo had two rings of city walls, many parts of which still survive. The first ring surrounded the ancient core of the Phoenician city, the Palaeopolis or Paleapolis (in the area east of Porta Nuova) and the Neapolis. Via Vittorio Emanuele was the main road east–west through this early walled city. The eastern edge of the walled city was on Via Roma and the ancient port in the vicinity of Piazza Marina. The wall circuit was approximately Porto Nuovo, Corso Alberti, Piazza Peranni, Via Isodoro, Via Candela, Via Venezia, Via Roma, Piazza Paninni, Via Biscottari, Via Del Bastione, Palazzo dei Normanni and back to Porto Nuovo.

The walls followed the course of the two rivers that surround the city, the Kemonia and the Papireto , creating a natural moat and improving the military security of the city. During the Roman era , they were certainly implemented, as deducible from the subsequent account of Procopius of Caesarea about the capture of Palermo [1] , 

In the medieval period the city was expanded with a second wall. Via Vittorio Emanuele continued to be the main road east–west through the walled city. The west gate was still Porta Nuova, the walls continued to Corso Alberti, to Piazza Vittorio Emanuele Orlando where it turned east along Via Volturno to Piazza Verdi and along the line of Via Cavour. At this northeast corner the Castello a Mare protected the port at La Cala. A huge chain was used to block La Cala with the other end at Santa Maria della Catena (St Mary of the Chain). The sea-side wall was along the western side of Foro Italico Umberto. The wall turns west along the northern side of Via Abramo Lincoln, continues along Corso Tukory. The wall turns north approximately on Via Benedetto, to Palazzo dei Normanni and back to Porta Nuova.

Several gates in the city wall survive.

Opera houses 

Up until the beginning of 20th century there were hundreds of small opera theatres known as magazzeni in the city of Palermo.

 The Teatro Massimo ("Greatest Theatre") was opened in 1897. It is the biggest in Italy, and one of the largest of Europe (the third after the Paris Opera and the Vienna State Opera), renowned for its perfect acoustics. Enrico Caruso sang in a performance of La Gioconda during the opening season, returning for Rigoletto at the very end of his career. Closed for renovation from 1974 until 1997, it is now restored and has an active schedule.
 The Teatro Politeama was built between 1867 and 1874.

Other sights 

The cathedral has a heliometer (solar observatory) dating to 1690, one of a number built in Italy in the 17th and 18th centuries. The device itself is quite simple: a tiny hole in one of the minor domes acts as pinhole camera, projecting an image of the sun onto the floor at solar noon (12:00 in winter, 13:00 in summer). There is a bronze line, la Meridiana, on the floor, running precisely north–south. The ends of the line mark the positions as at the summer and winter solstices; signs of the zodiac show the various other dates throughout the year.

The purpose of the instrument was to standardise the measurement of time and the calendar. The convention in Sicily had been that the (24‑hour) day was measured from the moment of dawn, which of course meant that no two locations had the same time and, more importantly, did not have the same time as in St. Peter's Basilica in Rome. It was also important to know when the vernal equinox occurred, to provide the correct date for Easter.

One site of interest is the Capuchin Catacombs, with many mummified corpses in varying degrees of preservation.

Close to the city is the  Monte Pellegrino, offering a panorama of the city, its surrounding mountains and the sea.

Another good panoramic viewpoint is the promontory of Monte Gallo, near Mondello Beach.

Moreton Bay fig of >30 m girth and of 32m height can be found on the Piazza Marina. This Ficus macrophylla is most probably the thickest tree in Europe.

On the boulevard Via Roma is the Palazzo delle Poste an official Italian government building created during the Mussolini era in the stripped classicism architectural style. It was designed by the rationalist and later fascist government architect, Angiolo Mazzoni.  Perhaps its most famous feature is the five mural cycle in the Futurist style painted by the artist Benedetta Cappa titled "Sintesi delle Comunicazioni" (Synthesis of Communication).

UNESCO World Heritage Sites 

UNESCO World Heritage Sites include the Palazzo Reale with the Cappella Palatina, the Chiesa di San Giovanni degli Eremiti, the Chiesa di Santa Maria dell’Ammiraglio, the Chiesa di San Cataldo, the Cattedrale di Palermo, the Palazzo della Zisa and the Ponte dell’Ammiraglio, adding to the list that makes Italy the country with most UNESCO world heritage sites.

Demographics 

In 2010, there were 1.2 million people living in the greater Palermo area, 655,875 of which resided in the City boundaries, of whom 47.4% were male and 52.6% were female. People under age 15 totalled 15.6% compared to pensioners who composed 17.2% of the population. This compares with the Italian average of 14.1% people under 15 years and 20.2% pensioners. The average age of a Palermo resident is 40.4 compared to the Italian average of 42.8. In the ten years between 2001 and 2010, the population of Palermo declined by 4.5%, while the population of Italy, as a whole, grew by 6.0%. The reason for Palermo's decline is a population flight to the suburbs, and to Northern Italy. The current birth rate of Palermo is 10.2 births per 1,000 inhabitants compared to the Italian average of 9.3 births.

, 97.79% of the population was of Italian descent. The largest immigrant group came from South Asia (mostly from Bangladesh and Sri Lanka): 0.80%, other European countries (mostly from Albania, Romania, Serbia, North Macedonia and Ukraine): 0.3%, and North Africa (mostly from Tunisia): 0.28%.

History

Early history 

Evidence of human settlement in the area now known as Palermo goes back to at least the Mesolithic period, perhaps around 8000 BC, where a group of cave drawings at nearby Addaura from that period have been found.  The original inhabitants were Sicani people who, according to Thucydides, arrived from the Iberian Peninsula (perhaps Catalonia).

Antiquity 

In the 8th c. It became one of the three main Phoenician colonies of Sicily, along with Motya and Soluntum.

The first settlement was later known as Paleapolis meaning "Old City". The site chosen by the Phoenicians was connected to the mountains with two roads that today have become Via Cappuccini and Corso Pisani. 

The Neapolis or "New City", the nucleus of the subsequent expansion of the colony, soon developed in the area between the Paleapolis and the port. The new district expanded rapidly, exceeding the size of the old quarter, and soon became the site of markets, artisan and commercial activities. The walls were extended to embrace the new urban perimeter and two new gates ere made, while the old gate at the port was moved to make room for the new buildings. In total there were 4 gates, one on each side of the city. The walls followed the course of the two rivers that surround the city, the Kemonia and the Papireto, creating a natural moat and improving the military security of the city. During the Roman era they were reinforced.

The Cassaro district was probably named after the walls themselves; the word Cassaro deriving from the Arab al-qaṣr (castle, stronghold, see also alcázar). The colony developed around a central street (decumanus) now the Corso Vittorio Emanuele.

Carthage was Palermo's major trading partner under the Phoenicians and the city enjoyed a prolonged peace during this period. Palermo came into contact with the Ancient Greeks between the 6th and the 5th centuries BC which preceded the Sicilian Wars, a conflict fought between the Greeks of Syracuse and the Carthaginians for control over the island of Sicily. During this war the Greeks named the settlement Pánormos or 'wide haven' due to its large anchorage, from which the present name of the city developed. The Carthaginians began using the Greek name on the city's coinage from the 5th centuryBC. It was from Palermo that Hamilcar I's fleet (which was defeated at the Battle of Himera) was launched. In 409 BC the city was looted by Hermocrates of Syracuse. The Sicilian Wars ended in 265 BC when Syracuse allied with the Romans of Italy and pushed the Carthaginians off of the island during the First Punic War. In 276 BC, during the Pyrrhic War, Panormos briefly became a Greek colony after being conquered by Pyrrhus of Epirus, but returned to Phoenician Carthage in 275 BC. In 254 BC Panormos was besieged and conquered by the Romans. Carthage attempted to reconquer Panormus in the battle of Panormus 250 BC but failed.

In Roman times luxurious residences were built and have been found in several locations (piazza Sett'Angeli, Palazzo Sclafani, piazza della Vittoria).

Middle Ages 

As the Roman Empire was falling apart, Palermo fell under the control of several Germanic tribes. The first were the Vandals in 440 AD under the rule of their king Geiseric. The Vandals had occupied all the Roman provinces in North Africa by 455 establishing themselves as a significant force. They acquired Corsica, Sardinia and Sicily shortly afterwards. However, they soon lost these newly acquired possessions to the Ostrogoths. The Ostrogothic conquest under Theodoric the Great began in 488; Theodoric supported Roman culture and government unlike the Germanic Goths. The Gothic War took place between the Ostrogoths and the Eastern Roman Empire, also known as the Byzantine Empire. Sicily was the first part of Italy to be taken under control of General Belisarius who was commissioned by the Eastern Emperor. In late 535 his Byzantine army of 7,500–9,000 and a fleet laid siege to the city in the Siege of Panormus, which had refused to surrender unlike all the other Ostrogothic-held cities in Sicily, and eventually prevailed.

Justinian I solidified his rule in the following years.

The Arabs took control of Palermo and most of Sicily in 831, and the Emirate of Sicily was established, though other cities persisted as Byzantine holdouts until as late as 965. Muslim rule in Palermo lasted for about 240 years.  Palermo (Bal'harm during Arab rule) displaced Syracuse as the capital of Sicily. It was said to have then begun to compete with Córdoba and Cairo in terms of importance and splendor. For more than a hundred years Palermo was the capital of a flourishing emirate.  The Arabs also introduced many agricultural crops which remain a mainstay of Sicilian cuisine.

After dynastic quarrels however, there was a Norman conquest in 1072. Normans conquered Palermo after a long siege. Indeed, the feat proved difficult because the Normans had never besieged such a populous city with such powerful walls. After 5 months siege, Normans built numerous stairs and war machines and finally conquered the city. The family who returned the city to Christianity were called the Hautevilles, including Robert Guiscard and his army, who is regarded as a hero by the natives.  It was under his nephew Roger II of Sicily that Norman holdings in Sicily and the southern part of the Italian Peninsula were promoted from the County of Sicily into the Kingdom of Sicily. The kingdom's capital was Palermo, with the King's Court held at the Palazzo dei Normanni. Much construction was undertaken during this period, such as the building of Palermo Cathedral. The Kingdom of Sicily became one of the wealthiest states in Europe.

Thanks to the marriage between Constance, Queen of Sicily, and Henry VI, Holy Roman Emperor, Palermo and the whole Sicily was inherited by their son Frederick II, who became King of Sicily in 1198 and Holy Roman Emperor in 1220. Palermo was the capital of Emperor Frederick II’s vast empire and also his favorite city. Muslims of Palermo emigrated or were expelled during Frederick's rule. After an interval of Angevin rule (1266–1282), Sicily came under control of the Aragon and Barcelona dynasties. By 1330, Palermo's population had declined to 51,000.

Early modern era 

From 1479 until 1713 Palermo was ruled by the Kingdom of Spain, and again between 1717 and 1718. Palermo was also under Savoy control between 1713 and 1717 and 1718–1720 as a result of the Treaty of Utrecht. It was ruled by Austria between 1720 and 1734.

Two Sicilies 

After the Treaty of Utrecht (1713), Sicily was handed over to the House of Savoy, but by 1734 it was in Bourbon possession. Charles III chose Palermo for his coronation as King of Sicily. Charles had new houses built for the growing population, while trade and industry grew as well. However, Palermo had become just another provincial city as the Royal Court resided in Naples. Charles' son Ferdinand, though disliked by the population, took refuge in Palermo after the French Revolution in 1798. His son Alberto died on the way to Palermo and is buried in the city.

When the Kingdom of the Two Sicilies was founded, the original capital city was Palermo (1816) but a year later moved to Naples.

From 1820 to 1848 Sicily was shaken by upheavals, which culminated on 12 January 1848, with a popular insurrection, the first one in Europe that year, led by Giuseppe La Masa. A parliament and constitution were proclaimed. The first president was Ruggero Settimo. The Bourbons reconquered Palermo in 1849, and it remained under their rule until the Expedition of the Thousand, led by Giuseppe Garibaldi, conquered the city after the Siege of Palermo in May 1860. After the plebiscite later that year Palermo, along with the rest of Sicily, became part of the new Kingdom of Italy (1861).

Italian unification 

The majority of Sicilians preferred independence to annexation to the Savoy kingdom; in 1866, Palermo became the seat of a week-long popular rebellion, which was finally crushed after martial law was declared. The Italian government blamed anarchists and the Church, specifically the Archbishop of Palermo, for the rebellion and began enacting anti-Sicilian and anti-clerical policies. A new cultural, economic and industrial growth was spurred by several families, like the Florio, the Ducrot, the Rutelli, the Sandron, the Whitaker, the Utveggio, and others. In the early twentieth century, Palermo expanded outside the old city walls, mostly to the north along the new boulevards Via Roma, Via Dante, Via Notarbartolo, and Viale della Libertà. These roads would soon boast a huge number of villas in the Art Nouveau style. Many of these were designed by the architect Ernesto Basile. The Grand Hotel Villa Igiea, designed by Ernesto Basile for the Florio family, is a good example of Palermitan Art Nouveau. The huge Teatro Massimo was designed in the same period by Giovan Battista Filippo Basile, Ernesto's father, and built by the Rutelli & Machì building firm of the industrial and old Rutelli Italian family in Palermo, and was opened in 1897.

The second world war 

During the Second World War, Palermo was heavily bombed by the Allied air forces in 1942 and 1943, until its capture during the Allied invasion of Sicily on 22 July 1943. The harbour (main objective of the air attacks) and the surrounding quarters were effectively destroyed, as was a considerable part of the city, with heavy civilian casualties.  When American troops entered Palermo in 1943 they were greeted with "a thunderous welcome by what seemed the entire population demonstrating their feelings about Fascist rule."   The two captured Italian generals claimed that they were happy because in their view "the Sicilians were not human beings but animals". Anti-Sicilian prejudice was part of the fascist regime's world view, being promoted by pro-fascist newspapers, particularly in the north of Italy.

Italian Republic and today 

In 1946 the city was declared the seat of the Regional Parliament, as capital of a Special Status Region (1947) whose seat is in the Palazzo dei Normanni.

A theme in the city's modern age has been the struggle against the Sicilian Mafia, Red Brigades and outlaws such as Salvatore Giuliano, who controlled the neighbouring area of Montelepre. The Italian state effectively has had to share control of the territory, economically and administratively, with the Mafia.

The "Sack of Palermo" was one of the dramatic consequences of this problem. This popular term refers to the speculative building practices that resulted in the destruction of a great number of historical buildings and green areas in favour of poor buildings, mainly between the 1950s and the 1980s. The reduced importance of agriculture in the Sicilian economy has led to a massive migration to the cities, especially Palermo, which swelled in size, leading to rapid expansion towards the north. The regulatory plans for expansion was largely ignored in the boom. New parts of town appeared almost out of nowhere, but without parks, schools, public buildings, proper roads and the other amenities that characterise a modern city.

The Cosa Nostra has traditionally been the most powerful group in Palermo. A CNN article in July 2019 indicated that Sicilian Mafia activity in Palermo was particularly notorious in one area: the town of Passo Rigano. "According to Italian police, the Mafia not only engages in extortion there, but also has a large role in the town's legal economy – with its involvement in business such as wholesale food supplies, online betting and gambling." The police investigation at the time also confirmed strong links between the Palermo area mafia and American organized crime,  particularly the Gambino crime family. According to La Repubblica, "Off they go, through the streets of Passo di Rigano, Boccadifalco, Torretta and at the same time, Brooklyn, Staten Island, New Jersey. Because from Sicily to the US, the old mafia has returned".

Culture

Religion

Patron saints 

The patron saint of Palermo is Saint Rosalia, who is widely revered.

On 14 July, people in Palermo celebrate the annual Festino, the most important religious event of the year. The Festino is a procession that goes through the main street of Palermo to commemorate the miracle attributed to Saint Rosalia who, it is believed, freed the city from the Black Death in 1624. Her remains were discovered in a cave on Monte Pellegrino, and her remains were carried around the city three times, banishing the plague. There is a sanctuary marking the spot where her remains were found which can be reached via a scenic bus ride from the city.

Before 1624 Palermo had four patron saints, one for each of the four major parts of the city. They were Saint Agatha, Saint Christina, Saint Nympha and Saint Olivia.

Saint Lucy is also honoured with a celebration on December 13th, during which the inhabitants of Palermo do not eat anything made with flour, but boil wheat in its natural state and use it to prepare a special dish called cuccìa. This commemorates the saving of the city from famine due to a miracle attributed to Saint Lucy; A ship full of grain mysteriously arrived in the city's harbour and the hungry population wasted no time in making flour but ate the grain as it arrived.

Saint Benedict the Moor is the heavenly protector of the city of Palermo.

The ancient patron of the city was the Genius of Palermo, genius loci and numen protector of the place, that became the secular patron of the modern Palermo.

Sports 

Palermo hosts a professional football team, Palermo Football Club, commonly referred to as simply Palermo, who currently compete in Serie B as of 2022, having been excluded from Serie B after the 2018–2019 season.
After the bankruptcy occurred in the summer of 2019, a new club was formed by the company Hera Hora Srl.

The Targa Florio was an open road endurance car race held near Palermo. Founded in 1906, it used to be one of the oldest sports car racing events until it was discontinued in 1977 due to safety concerns but has since run as a rallying event. Palermo was home to the grand depart of the 2008 Giro d'Italia. The initial stage was a  TTT (Team Time Trial).

The Internazionali Femminili di Palermo is an annual ladies professional tennis event held in the city, which is part of the WTA Tour.

The american football team is Eagles United Palermo and it plays in stadium of Carini.

Economy and infrastructure 

As Sicily's administrative capital, Palermo is a centre for much of the region's finance, tourism and commerce. The city currently hosts an international airport, and Palermo's economic growth over the years has brought the opening of many new businesses. The economy mainly relies on tourism and services, but also has commerce, shipbuilding and agriculture. The city, however, still has high unemployment levels, high corruption and a significant black market empire (Palermo being the home of the Sicilian Mafia).

Public transport 

Palermo has a local railway called the Palermo metropolitan railway service.

Buses 

About 90 different routes reach every part of the city.

Trams 

Palermo has a public tram system finalized in 2015 and operated by AMAT. There are 4 lines:

 Roccella — Central Station
 Borgo Nuovo — Notarbartolo Station
 CEP — Notarbartolo Station
 Corso Calatafimi — Notarbartolo Station

Coaches 

The local coach company, AST, with its coaches totalling 35 lines, links Palermo to all of the main cities in Sicily.

Palermo Public Transportation Statistics 

The average amount of time people spend commuting with public transit in Palermo, for example to and from work, on a weekday is 63 min. 14.% of public transit riders, ride for more than 2 hours every day. The average amount of time people wait at a stop or station for public transit is 23 min, while 48% of riders wait for over 20 minutes on average every day. The average distance people usually ride in a single trip with public transit is 4.4 km, while 3% travel for over 12 km in a single direction.

Roads 

Palermo is a key intersection on the Sicilian road network, being the junction between the eastern A19 motorway to Trapani, the southeastern A29 to airport and Mazara del Vallo and the southwestern A19 to Catania and A20 to Messina. Palermo is one of the main cities on European route E90. The three main national roads starting from Palermo are the SS113, SS121, SS186 and the SS624.

Airports 

It is dedicated to Giovanni Falcone and Paolo Borsellino, two anti-mafia judges killed by the Mafia in the early 1990s.

The airport's rail facility, known as Punta Raisi railway station, can be reached from Palermo Centrale, Palermo Notarbartolo and Palermo Francia railway stations.

Palermo-Boccadifalco Airport is the second airport of the city.

Port 

The port of Palermo, founded by the Phoenicians over 2,700 years ago, is, together with the port of Messina, the main port of Sicily. From here ferries link Palermo to Cagliari, Genoa, Livorno, Naples, Tunis and other cities and carry a total of almost 2 million passengers annually. It is also an important port for cruise ships. Traffic includes also almost  of cargo and 80,000 TEUs yearly. The port also has links to minor Sicilian islands such as Ustica and the Aeolian Islands (via Cefalù in summer). Inside the Port of Palermo there is a section known as "tourist marina" for sailing yachts and catamarans.

National rail 

The main railway station of Palermo is Palermo Centrale which links to the other cities of Sicily, including Agrigento, Trapani and Catania, and through Messina and the strait to the rest of Italy. The railways also connect to the Palermo airport with departures every thirty minutes.

Education 

The local university is the University of Palermo, the island's second oldest university. It was officially founded in 1806, although historical records indicate that medicine and law have been taught there since the late 15th century. The Orto botanico di Palermo (Palermo botanical gardens) is home to the university's Department of Botany and is also open to visitors.

International relations

Twin towns – sister cities 

Palermo is twinned with:

  Bizerte, Tunisia
  Bukavu, DR of the Congo
  Chengdu, China
  Düsseldorf, Germany

  Grand-Bassam, Ivory Coast
  Hanoi, Vietnam
  Khan Yunis, Palestine
  Miami, United States
  Monterey, United States
  Montpellier, France
  Ottawa, Canada
  Palermo, Argentina
  Palermo, Colombia
  Pistoia, Italy
  Samara, Russia
  Santiago de Cuba, Cuba
  Sestu, Italy
  Tbilisi, Georgia
  Timișoara, Romania
  Valletta, Malta
  Yaroslavl, Russia

Notable people 
 Eleonora Abbagnato (born 1978), ballet dancer
 Simonetta Agnello Hornby (born 1945), writer
 Emerico Amari (1810–1870), politician
 Roberto Andò (born 1959), film director
 Lucio Maria Attinelli (born 1933), journalist and writer
 Aldo Baglio (born 1958), actor
 Pietro Ballo (born 1952), tenor
 Mario Balotelli (born 1990), footballer
 Mario Bardi (1922–1998), painter
 Ernesto Basile (1857–1932), architect
 Letizia Battaglia (1935–2022), photographer, photojournalist, and politician
 Francesco Benigno (born 1967), actor
 Alfredo Bordonali (born 1919), football player
 Paolo Borsellino (1940–1992), judge
 Luigi Maria Burruano (1948-2017), actor
 Tommaso Buscetta (1928–2000), member and notable pentito of the Sicilian Mafia
 Lando Buzzanca (1935-2022), actor
 Alessandro Cagliostro (1743-1795), magician (paranormal) and adventurer
 Stanislao Cannizzaro (1826–1910), chemist
 Bruno Caruso (1927–2018), painter, illustrator, graphic designer and political activist
 Marco Cecchinato (born 1992), tennis player
 Daniele Ciprì (born 1962), film director
 Max Crivello (born 1958), illustrator and painter
 Giovanni Falcone (1939–1992), judge
 Salvatore Ficarra (born 1971), actor
 Luca Flores (1956-1995), pianist and composer
 Vincenzo Florio (1883–1959),  entrepreneur, heir of the rich Florio economic dynasty, founder of the Targa Florio
 Corrado Fortuna (born 1978), actor
 Franco Franchi (1928–1992), actor
 Pia Giancaro (born 1950), Italian retired actress
 Claudio Gioè (born 1975), actor
 Filippa Giordano (born 1974), singer
Marco Glaviano (born 1942),  photographer and architet
 Libero Grassi (1924–1991), businessman
 Ciccio Ingrassia (1922–2003), actor
 Beniamino Iraci (born 1989), professional football player
 Ugo La Malfa (1903–1979), politician
 Luigi Lo Cascio (born 1967), actor
 Rosalia Lombardo (1918–1920), known as the Sleeping Beauty
 Louise of Orléans (1812–1850), Queen of The Belgians
 Maria Christina of the Two Sicilies (1806–1878), Queen of Spain
 Filippo Mancuso (1922–2011), magistrate and Italian Minister of Justice
 Franco Maresco (born 1958), film director
 Sergio Mattarella (born 1941), president of Italy
 Giovanni Meli (1740–1815), poet and playwright
 Silvio Micali (born 1954), computer scientist
 Gabriele Minì (born 2005), racing driver
 Vittorio Emanuele Orlando (1860–1952), Prime Minister of Italy
 Sophia Petrillo (born 1905), character on The Golden Girls 
 Valentino Picone (born 1971), actor
 Pif (television host) (born 1972), actor and film director
 Amelia Pinto (1876–1946), opera singer
 Giuseppe Pitrè (1841-1916), folklorist, medical doctor, professor and senator 
Eva Riccobono (born 1983), model
 Antonio Rinaldi (architect) 
(1709–1794)
 Gianni Riotta (born 1954), journalist
 Giuni Russo (1951 -2004), singer
 Alfredo Salafia (1869–1933), embalmer and taxidermist
 Pietro Scaglione (1906–1971), magistrate
 Alessandro Scarlatti (1660-1725), composer
 Renato Schifani (born 1950), President of the Senate
 Salvatore Schillaci (born 1964), footballer
 Francesco Scianna (born 1982), actor
 Enzo Sellerio (1924–2012), photographer, publisher and collector
 Giacomo Serpotta (1656–1732), sculptor
 Giuseppe Serpotta (1653–1719), sculptor
 Tony Sperandeo (born 1953), actor
 Antonio Starabba, Marchese di Rudinì (1839–1908), Prime Minister of Italy
 Giuseppe Tomasi di Lampedusa (1896–1957), writer
 Delia Vaccarello (1960–2019), journalist and activist for LGBT rights
 Fulco di Verdura (1898–1978), duke and jeweller

Honorary citizens 

People awarded the honorary citizenship of Palermo are:

See also 

 Hugo Falcandus
 List of mayors of Palermo
 Outline of Palermo
 Circolo Matematico di Palermo

Notes

References

Citations

Sources 

 
 
 
 .
 .
 
 Nef, Anneliese. A Companion to Medieval Palermo: The History of a Mediterranean City from 600 to 1500 (Brill, 2013).
 Tronzo, William. "The Artistic Culture of Twelfth-Century Sicily, with a Focus on Palermo." in Sicily and the Mediterranean (Palgrave Macmillan, New York, 2015) pp. 61–76.

External links 

  
 Tourist Information Centre
 Palermo Tourist Board
 Palermo Coupon
 Things to do in Palermo
 Palermo capitale italiana della cultura 2018 

Coastal towns in Sicily
Mediterranean port cities and towns in Italy
Municipalities of the Metropolitan City of Palermo
Capitals of former nations
Phoenician colonies in Sicily
Populated places established in the 8th century BC
Carthaginian colonies